Beras Basah Island is a small island located in the Straits of Makassar and approximately  east off the coast of Borneo. Administratively, this island is under the City of Bontang government and Province of East Kalimantan. The island is known to be a tourist destination as a dive site that provides tropical underwater life.

Etymology and History 

The origin name of Beras Basah according to local folklore comes from the Indonesian words of Beras (rice) and Basah (wet). Once upon a time, there was a ship belonging to the Sultanate of Kutai which was sailing in the Straits of Makassar. The ship carries food which includes rice. The ship arrived - suddenly sank and spilled its luggage. Because the waters where the shipwreck is shallow, the ship's congregation, which is mostly rice, does not sink, but appears partly like a mound. Over time the rice mound turns into a white sand island like rice which is always wet because it is surrounded by the ocean.

Transportation access 
To be able to visit this island there are several accesses which all come from several piers or ports from Bontang. The fastest access is via Marina Beach of Badak NGL pier by using a speed boat which takes approximately fifteen minutes. Alternative access through Tanjung Limau and Tanjung Laut docks using small motorized boats that take approximately one hour.

See also 

 Bontang
 Makassar Strait
 List of islands of Indonesia

References

External links 

  Official website of Bontang

Landforms of East Kalimantan
Islands of Kalimantan
Maritime Southeast Asia
Bontang